The Max Planck Institute of Microstructure Physics in Halle (Saale) is a research institute in Germany in the field of materials research. It was founded in 1992 by Hellmut Fischmeister and is a follow-up to the German Academy of Sciences Institute of Solid State Physics and Electron Microscopy. The institute moved into new buildings from 1997 till 1999. It is one of 84 institutes in the Max Planck Society (Max-Planck-Gesellschaft).

The institute has three main departments:
 Stuart Parkin
 Joyce Poon
 Xinliang Feng

Former departments include the following:
The Theory Department, headed by Prof. Eberhard Gross, mainly carries out theoretical research on the electronic, magnetic, optical, and electrical properties of micro- and nanostructured solid-state systems'.
The Experimental Department 1, headed by Prof. Jürgen Kirschner, mainly deals with the magnetic properties of dimensionally reduced systems and their dependence on electronic structure, crystalline structure and morphology.
The Experimental Department 2, headed by Prof. Ulrich Gösele, is focussed on the scientific understanding, design and fabrication of new materials for information, communication, engineering as well as bio-technological applications.
The Experimental Department 3, headed by Prof. Johannes Heydenreich, is focused on analytical methods using high-resolution electronic microscopy.

PhD program

 The Max Planck Institute for Microstructure Physics, the Martin Luther University of Halle-Wittenberg, and the Fraunhofer Institute for Mechanics of Materials offer a PhD program under the "International Max-Planck Research School (IMPRS) of Nanostructures".

References

External links
 Max Planck Institute of Microstructure Physics
 Comprehensive list of scientific publications from the institute

Microstructure Physics
Physics institutes